Limboor  or Limbur is a village in Madnur / Madnoor  mandal in Nizamabad district
in the state of Telangana in India.

Geography
Limboor is bound on its side by Lendi river, is one of the important tributaries of the Manjira River.
Godavari River has left and right tributaries, Manjira River is one of right side tributaries. It enters Telangana at Kandhakurthi in Nizamabad district.

List of Assembly constituency

List of Parliament constituency

References

Villages in Nizamabad district